Black Rose: A Rock Legend is the ninth studio album by Irish rock band Thin Lizzy. Released in 1979, it has been described as one of the band's "greatest, most successful albums". It was the first time that blues rock guitarist Gary Moore remained in Thin Lizzy long enough to record an album—after previous brief stints in 1974 and 1977 with the band. The album peaked at No. 2 on the UK charts-- making it the band's highest-charting album in the UK. It was their fourth consecutive album to be certified Gold by the BPI.

Songs
Black Rose included the second song Phil Lynott wrote about a member of his family titled "Sarah", the first song by this name having appeared on 1972's Shades of a Blue Orphanage, written about his grandmother, also named Sarah. The song on Black Rose is about his new-born daughter.

The last track "Róisín Dubh", consists of traditional songs, all arranged by Lynott and Moore, as well as many original parts. The song "Will You Go Lassie, Go" (also known as "Wild Mountain Thyme") is sometimes mistakenly credited as a traditional song but was in fact written by William McPeake and first recorded by Francis McPeake. It is credited on the album to "F. McPeak."

At least two of the songs - "Waiting for an Alibi" and "S & M" - were debuted on the early summer 1978 dates before Brian Robertson's departure from the band.

Reception

In a contemporary favourable review for the Irish magazine Hot Press Dermot Stokes remarked: "Black Rose marks no major departure" from Thin Lizzy's "crystallised" imagery and sound, although "a poppier-feel insinuates itself here and there--seemingly by design". However, he was dubious about the rosy vision of Ireland offered in the title track and wondered whether the band had lost contact with the real life of their country. Writing in Smash Hits Red Starr stated that the album: "lacked memorable melodies" and that "the blend of traditional tunes in the title track is an unholy mess." Starr acknowledged that fans of the band would be happy with "the reworking of their familiar hard rock style" but went on to note that there was: "nothing new for the rest of us."

In a modern review Greg Prato of AllMusic described the album as: "Thin Lizzy's last true classic album" and "their most musically varied, accomplished, and successful studio album." He praised Moore's presence as: "a perfect fit" and singled out "Do Anything You Want To", "Waiting for an Alibi" and "Sarah" as stand-out tracks.  He also praised the title track and its "amazing, complex guitar solo." In his Collectors Guide to Heavy Metal, Martin Popoff defined the album as "a charmed release" where "Waiting for an Alibi" and "Got to Give It Up" emerge as "two Thin Lizzy classics" and the title track "is on a plane more in league with fine literature than anything as base as rock 'n' roll."

Track listings

Deluxe edition
A new remastered and expanded edition of Black Rose was released on 27 June 2011. This new edition is a 2-CD set—with the original album on disc one and bonus material on disc two.

Singles
 Waiting For An Alibi/With Love – 7" (1979)
 Do Anything You Want To/Just The Two Of Us – 7" (1979)
 Do Anything You Want To/S & M – 7" (1979)
 Got To Give It Up/With Love – 7" (1979)
 Sarah/Got To Give It Up – 7" (1979)
 Star Trax EP: Jailbreak/Johnny The Fox Meets Jimmy The Weed/The Boys Are Back In Town/Waiting For An Alibi – 7" (1979)

Personnel
Thin Lizzy
Phil Lynott – bass guitar, lead vocals, twelve-string guitar, producer on "With Love"
Scott Gorham – lead guitar, rhythm guitar, backing vocals
Gary Moore – lead and rhythm guitar, backing vocals
Brian Downey – drums, percussion

Additional musicians
Jimmy Bain – bass guitar on "With Love"
Huey Lewis – harmonica on "Sarah" and "With Love"
Mark Nauseef – drums on "Sarah" (uncredited)

Production
Tony Visconti – producer
Kit Woolven – engineer
Will Reid Dick, Chris Tsangarides – assistant engineers

Charts

Album

Singles

Waiting for an Alibi

Do Anything You Want To

Sarah

Certifications

References

Thin Lizzy albums
1979 albums
Albums produced by Tony Visconti
Vertigo Records albums
Warner Records albums
Albums recorded at Morgan Sound Studios